
Warus Quta (Aymara  grey-brown,  lake, "grey-brown lake", also spelled Barrus Kkota) is a lake in the Kimsa Cruz mountain range in the Andes of Bolivia. It is situated in the La Paz Department, Loayza Province, Cairoma Municipality. Warus Quta lies between the mountains Taruja Umaña in the west and Mama Uqllu in the east. The river Taruj Umaña originates near the lake. It flows to the west and then to the north-west as an affluent of the La Paz River.

References 

Lakes of La Paz Department (Bolivia)